In Greek mythology, Tenages  or Tenage  ( Tenágēs, Tenágē) was one of the Heliadae, a son of Rhodos and Helios. He was murdered by his brothers, Actis, Triopas, Macar and Candalus, who were envious of Tenages's skill at science being the superior out of the Heliadae.

Notes

References
Diodorus Siculus, The Library of History translated by Charles Henry Oldfather. Twelve volumes. Loeb Classical Library. Cambridge, Massachusetts: Harvard University Press; London: William Heinemann, Ltd. 1989. Vol. 3. Books 4.59–8. Online version at Bill Thayer's Web Site
Diodorus Siculus, Bibliotheca Historica. Vol 1-2. Immanel Bekker. Ludwig Dindorf. Friedrich Vogel. in aedibus B. G. Teubneri. Leipzig. 1888-1890. Greek text available at the Perseus Digital Library.

Children of Helios